Vera Lesik (1910-1975) was a Canadian writer on the loss of Ukrainian heritage.

Born in Winnipeg to Ukrainian Baptist parents, she graduated B.A. from University of Manitoba in 1929.

Written under the pseudonym Vera Lysenko, her Men in Sheepskin Coats; a Study In Assimilation (1947) was a controversial study of the gradual loss of the native Ukrainian heritage, a theme continued in her novel Yellow Boots (1954).

See also

Archives 
There is a Vera Lysenko fonds at Library and Archives Canada. The archival reference number is R5614.

References

External links
 Memorable Manitobans: Vera Lysenko, "further reading" added, 2019
 at encyclopedia.com, 2019
 Alexandra Kruchka Glynn, Reintroducing Vera Lysenko, Journal of Ukrainian studies, 15, 1, Summer 1990, University of Alberta, p 53 - 70

1910 births
1975 deaths
Canadian women novelists
20th-century Canadian novelists
20th-century Canadian women writers